Iván Lázaro Pedroso Soler (born December 17, 1972) is a retired Cuban track and field athlete, who specialized in the long jump, and the current coach of Nelson Évora, Yulimar Rojas and Ana Peleteiro.

Career

Pedroso was born in Havana, Cuba. In July 1990, aged just 17, Pedroso jumped more than eight meters for the first time. Facing tough competition from Carl Lewis, Mike Powell and others, he still won numerous gold medals in international competitions in the early nineties. He almost never finished in less than first place. When Powell and Lewis retired, Pedroso became a dominant athlete, winning numerous indoor and outdoor World Championships. In fact he won all major championships from 1997 to 2001, including an Olympic gold medal in Sydney.

At altitude in Sestriere in 1995, Iván Pedroso jumped 8.96 meters with a measured wind of +1.2. This would have been the world record, beating Mike Powell by one centimeter. However, the Italian Athletics Federation did not forward the result to the IAAF for ratification, since the wind mark was declared invalid, because a person stood in front of the anemometer, probably intercepting the correct wind measurement.

Despite his great success in the World Championships, due to injuries, he did not make a great impact on the Olympic Games like former rival Carl Lewis. He did finish fourth at the age of 19 in Barcelona 1992, but in Atlanta 1996 he had injury troubles and could only finish 12th in the long jump final. In the 2000 Olympics (Sydney), Pedroso spectacularly won the gold medal with his last jump. In a tough contest at the 2004 Olympics, he finished 7th. Pedroso has not entered in any major championships since, although he still had several jumps over 8 metres.

On 26 September 2007, Pedroso announced his retirement.

His best jump was officially 8.71 meters, in Salamanca 1995.

He is the coach of 2013 triple jump world champion, Teddy Tamgho. Pedroso is a cousin of the hurdler Aliuska López.

Achievements

References

External links

1972 births
Living people
Cuban male long jumpers
Athletes (track and field) at the 1992 Summer Olympics
Athletes (track and field) at the 1996 Summer Olympics
Athletes (track and field) at the 2000 Summer Olympics
Athletes (track and field) at the 2004 Summer Olympics
Olympic athletes of Cuba
Olympic gold medalists for Cuba
Athletes (track and field) at the 1991 Pan American Games
Athletes (track and field) at the 1995 Pan American Games
Athletes (track and field) at the 1999 Pan American Games
Athletes (track and field) at the 2003 Pan American Games
Athletes (track and field) at the 2007 Pan American Games
World Athletics Championships medalists
Medalists at the 2000 Summer Olympics
Olympic gold medalists in athletics (track and field)
Pan American Games medalists in athletics (track and field)
Pan American Games gold medalists for Cuba
Pan American Games bronze medalists for Cuba
Universiade medalists in athletics (track and field)
Goodwill Games medalists in athletics
Central American and Caribbean Games gold medalists for Cuba
Competitors at the 1998 Central American and Caribbean Games
Competitors at the 2006 Central American and Caribbean Games
Universiade gold medalists for Cuba
World Athletics Indoor Championships winners
World Athletics Championships winners
Central American and Caribbean Games medalists in athletics
Medalists at the 1997 Summer Universiade
Competitors at the 1998 Goodwill Games
Competitors at the 2001 Goodwill Games
Medalists at the 1991 Pan American Games
Medalists at the 1995 Pan American Games
Medalists at the 1999 Pan American Games
Medalists at the 2003 Pan American Games
20th-century Cuban people
21st-century Cuban people